In United States presidential elections, the tipping-point state is the first state that gives the winning candidate a majority of electoral votes, thereby securing the candidate's victory in the Electoral College, when all states are arranged in decreasing order of their vote margins for the ultimate winner.

The tipping-point state can be interpreted as a counterfactual, on the assumption that outcomes in different states are strongly correlated: if the nation-wide vote margin were shifted, but the order of states by vote margin were unchanged, the tipping-point state would be the state or states in which a change in the state winner would result in a change in the national winner. The term may also refer to the state that would give the second-place candidate a majority of the electoral vote when all states are arranged in order of their vote margins; this is typically, but not always, the same state as in the primary definition (see section Origin and definition for exceptions).

Since the number of electors was set at 538 prior to the 1964 United States presidential election, 270 votes have been necessary to win the Electoral College. In some elections, there can be multiple tipping-point states for different candidates, since if no candidate receives 270 electoral votes, there is instead a contingent election in the United States House of Representatives. For example, in the 2020 United States presidential election, if Wisconsin, Arizona, and Georgia had gone to Donald Trump, the electoral college would've been tied 269-269, making Wisconsin the tipping-point state for a Biden victory, but Pennsylvania, the next-closest, a tipping-point state for a Trump victory.

Origin and definition

The concept of a tipping-point state was popularized by FiveThirtyEight's Nate Silver. FiveThirtyEight regularly predicts which state will be the tipping-point state in a given presidential election through the site's "Tipping Point Index". Past predictions of tipping-point states include either Michigan or Ohio in the 2008 election, Ohio in the 2012 election, Florida in the 2016 election, and Pennsylvania in the 2020 election.

Because a majority of the electoral vote is required in order to clinch the presidential election in the Electoral College, the tipping-point state for the first-place finisher and the second-place finisher may differ if more than two candidates received electoral votes, or if a shift in the states would leave the electoral vote tied. Tipping-point states may also differ depending on the disposition of faithless electors, on the assumption that certain faithless electors may have chosen to give their vote to the candidate they had pledged to vote for if their vote would have given that candidate a majority of the vote. Because electoral votes are awarded to winners of Washington, D.C. and certain congressional districts, it is possible for the tipping-point to be something other than a state.

The tipping-point state is not related to the chronological order in which state-by-state election results are reported, either by media outlets or by state officials. Rather, the media uses decision desks to project the apparent winners of each state before all the votes are counted, and will announce a state that they project will give a candidate enough electoral votes to become the apparent presidential winner. The tipping-point state can only be determined after all the votes in each state are counted and certified, and thus all the vote margins are accurate. For example, the projection of Joe Biden to have won the state of Pennsylvania in the 2020 election made him the projected winner of the electoral college, but for Biden the tipping point state of the 2020 election was Wisconsin, which was called for him three days prior.

Example: 2012 presidential election

Obama victory tipping point state
In the 2012 presidential election, Barack Obama defeated Mitt Romney in the electoral vote, taking 332 electoral votes compared to 206 for Romney. As with all presidential elections since the 1964 election, 270 electoral votes were needed to win a majority in the Electoral College. Obama would still have won a majority of the electoral vote even if he did not win Virginia, Ohio, and Florida, the three states in which he had his lowest margin of victory. However, if Obama had lost those three states as well as Colorado (the state in which Obama's margin of victory was smallest after excluding Virginia, Ohio, and Florida), he would not have won a majority of the Electoral College. Thus, Colorado was the tipping point state for an Obama victory in 2012.

Hypothetical Romney victory tipping point state

In a hypothetical 2012 presidential election in which every state uniformly shifted to Romney by 5.38 points, Romney would have won a majority of the electoral vote. In this scenario, Romney would have won 275 electoral votes by adding Florida, Ohio, Virginia, and Colorado to the states he won historically. By contrast, if each state had only shifted uniformly to Romney by 5.36 points, Romney would have still have won Florida, Ohio, and Virginia, but would not have won Colorado and would not have won a majority of the electoral vote. Thus, Colorado was the tipping point state for a Romney victory in 2012.

List of tipping-point states by election
This table shows the tipping point state for the winning candidate in each presidential election since 1832, without any reassignment of faithless electors.

Tipping-point states by frequency
The following states have been the tipping-point state for the winning candidate (without accounting for any change in the disposition of faithless electors) beginning with the 1832 election:

Notes

References

Works cited

 

United States Electoral College
United States presidential elections terminology